The Ap Lei Chau Power Station was an oil-fired power station in Ap Lei Chau, Hong Kong.

History
The power station was commissioned in 1968 and was the largest power station in British Hong Kong at that time. The power station was decommissioned starting in 1984 and eventually closed in 1989. Its generators were then moved to Lamma Power Station. The area around the power station is now surrounded by the South Horizons residential area.

Generation
The power station provided electricity to the western area of Hong Kong.

See also
 List of power stations in Hong Kong
 Hongkong Electric Company

References

1968 establishments in Hong Kong
1989 disestablishments in Hong Kong
Energy infrastructure completed in 1968
Former power stations in Hong Kong